Semidysderina is a genus of spiders in the family Oonopidae. It was first described in 2011 by Platnick & Dupérré. , it contains 6 species, all found in Colombia.

Species

Semidysderina comprises the following species:
Semidysderina donachui Platnick & Dupérré, 2011
Semidysderina kochalkai Platnick & Dupérré, 2011
Semidysderina lagila Platnick & Dupérré, 2011
Semidysderina marta Platnick & Dupérré, 2011
Semidysderina mulleri Platnick & Dupérré, 2011
Semidysderina sturmi Platnick & Dupérré, 2011

References

Oonopidae
Araneomorphae genera
Spiders of South America